Ismail Yassine in the Navy (translit. Ismail Yassine fi El Ostool) is a 1957 Egyptian Comedy film directed by Fatin Abdel Wahab.

Plot 
In this 1957 comedy, two cousins fall in love and wish to get married. The mother of the girl opposes the marriage, and would rather have her daughter marry a rich old man. To speed up the marriage, the girl asks her lover to join the navy so that her mother would agree to their marriage.

Cast
 Ismail Yassine as Ragab
 Zahrat El Ola as Nadia
 Ahmed Ramzy as Mounir
 Mahmoud El-Meliguy as Abbas El Zefr
 Zeinat Sedki as Nadia's mother

See also
 Cinema of Egypt
 Lists of Egyptian films
 List of Egyptian films of the 1950s

References

External links

 
 
 

 
 

1957 films
1950s Arabic-language films
1957 comedy films
Egyptian comedy films
Films directed by Fatin Abdel Wahab